Dhadha Bujurg is a Gram Panchayat located in Kushinagar district of Uttar Pradesh. It is located 30 km east from Gorakhpur railway station, 3 km west from Hata, 18 km away from Kaptanganj and 36 km away from Deoria. It includes 7 villages namely Dhadha Bujurg, Bandhu Tola, Pakwainar, Kubri Tola, Baldhiha, Harpur, and Badhri Tola.

Education
There are several schools and colleges located in this gram panchayat:
 Sharda Devi Memorial School
 Sant Kabir Children School
 Kanya Maha Vidyalaya
 P. P. Dhadha Bujurg School

References

External links 

Villages in Kushinagar district